Were (Weredai), or Kiunum, is a Papuan language spoken in Dewara village, Gogodala Rural LLG, Western Province, Papua New Guinea.

References

Languages of Western Province (Papua New Guinea)
Tirio languages